Saints John Neumann and Maria Goretti Catholic High School (Ss. Neumann Goretti for short) is a private Roman Catholic high school located at 1736 South Tenth Street in the South Philadelphia area of Philadelphia, Pennsylvania, United States, in the Roman Catholic Archdiocese of Philadelphia.

Background
In fall 2004 Saints John Neumann and Maria Goretti Catholic High School was created by a merger of Saint John Neumann High School, established in 1934, and Saint Maria Goretti High School, established in 1955. The school is located in the former Goretti campus. In 2005 most of the students at Neumann Goretti came from South Philadelphia. During the first school year Neumann Goretti used the Neumann athletic fields. The former Neumann campus became St. John Neumann Place, a housing development for senior citizens.

Notable alumni
Christian Barmore, American football player
Jerry Blavat, radio personality
Quade Green, basketball player
Rick Jackson, basketball player
Scoop Jardine, basketball player
Diamond Johnson, basketball player
Josh Ockimey, baseball player
June Olkowski, basketball coach

References

External links
 School Website
 NG Saints Football

Roman Catholic secondary schools in Philadelphia
Educational institutions established in 1934
1934 establishments in Pennsylvania
South Philadelphia
Italian-American culture in Philadelphia